Pietro Mola (1755-1829) was the Bishop of Bergamo from 1821 to 1829.

Life

Born in Codogno part of the Austrian ruled Duchy of Milan he was named by the authorities of the Cisalpine Republic pastor of the parish of Codogno. He was later named abbot of the abbey of Casalmaggiore and in 1821 he was named bishop of Bergamo.During his episcopacy he reaffirmed the teaching of pope Pius VII against the carbonari. Mola also blessed the new seminary of Bergamo at the top of Colle San Giovanni.
He dies in 1829.

References

External links and additional sources
 (for Chronology of Bishops) 
 (for Chronology of Bishops) 

1755 births
1829 deaths
People from the Province of Lodi
Bishops of Bergamo
19th-century Italian Roman Catholic bishops